Fibra (lit. Fever) is a Croatian comic book publisher. It was established in 2006 by Marko Šunjić in Zagreb. Apart from domestic titles, it is focused on publishing lesser and more known titles from all around the world to the masses. The house also presented at the book fair Interliber.

References

External links
  
 Article at Stripovi.com 
 Interview with the owner

Publishing companies established in 2006
Publishing companies of Croatia
Companies based in Zagreb
Croatian companies established in 2006